The women's triple jump event at the 2003 European Athletics U23 Championships was held in Bydgoszcz, Poland, at Zawisza Stadion on 18 and 20 July.

Medalists

Results

Final
20 July

Qualifications
18 July
Qualifying 13.75 or 12 best to the Final

Group A

Group B

Participation
According to an unofficial count, 19 athletes from 14 countries participated in the event.

 (1)
 (1)
 (1)
 (1)
 (2)
 (1)
 (1)
 (2)
 (1)
 (2)
 (2)
 (2)
 (1)
 (1)

References

Triple jump
Triple jump at the European Athletics U23 Championships